Center of balance (COB) is a point with respect to which the object in question is balanced with respect to applied forces. In particular areas the term may have specific meaning and special discussion, and may refer to one of the following definitions:

Center of mass, the most common meaning and most of other meanings are derived from it
Centrer point of balance in dancing
Center of balance (horse), a place on the horse back that projects onto its center of mass
Center of Balance, a song by John Norum
a track on the 1999 album Slipped into Tomorrow
a track on the 1996 album Worlds Away